Ali Kola (also Romanized as ‘Alī Kolā, ‘Alī Kalā, and ‘Ālīkolā) is a village in Poshtkuh Rural District, Chahardangeh District, Sari County, Mazandaran Province, Iran. At the 2006 census, its population was 108, in 25 families.

References 

Populated places in Sari County